Andrew Charles Elliott (June 22, 1829 – April 9, 1889) was a British Columbian politician and jurist.

Career
Elliott's varied career in British Columbia included gold commissioner, stipendiary magistrate, and, following the union of the Island and Mainland Colonies in 1866, high sheriff of the province. He resigned his magistracy to take the post as High Sheriff. He was a member of the colony's appointed Colonial Assembly from 1865 to 1866. After the colony became a province of Canada, he was elected, in 1875, to the Victoria City seat in the provincial legislature and became leader of the opposition.  Before his election to the House, he was a provincial magistrate in Lillooet.

In 1876, Elliott became the fourth Premier of the province on the defeat of George Anthony Walkem's government in a Motion of No Confidence. His government was unstable, and he was unable to make progress with the federal government on the province's demands that Ottawa builds a railway to the Pacific. Tax increases and the government's failure to secure a railway terminus for Victoria, British Columbia led to Elliott's defeat in his riding in the 1878 election as well as the defeat of his government.

Death
Andrew Charles Elliott is interred in the Ross Bay Cemetery in Victoria, British Columbia. His obituary in Amor de Cosmos' Victoria Colonist newspaper read:

Family life
His daughter Mary married James W. Douglas, the only son of James Douglas, but his son-in-law died at age 32, and Elliott was one of the pallbearers at the funeral.

External links 
Biography at the Dictionary of Canadian Biography Online
Halfway to the Goldfields, Lorraine Harris, J.J. Douglas, Vancouver, 1977 

1829 births
1889 deaths
Premiers of British Columbia
Elliot, Andrew Charles
Canadian civil servants
Gold commissioners in British Columbia
People from Lillooet
Irish emigrants to pre-Confederation British Columbia
Members of the Colonial Assembly of British Columbia
Colony of British Columbia (1858–1866) judges